Adilya Vyldanova (born 19 March 1994) is a Kazakhstani footballer who plays as a midfielder for Women's Championship club FC Okzhetpes and the Kazakhstan women's national team.

Career
Vyldanova has been capped for the Kazakhstan national team, appearing for the team during the 2019 FIFA Women's World Cup qualifying cycle.

References

External links

 
 
 

1994 births
Living people
Kazakhstani women's footballers
Kazakhstan women's international footballers
Women's association football midfielders
BIIK Kazygurt players